C++ doesn't have:
 PROC – first class nested functions (emulation due to local definitions of class-types, which then could be functors, also new C++11 has lambda functions),
 OP and PRIO – definable operator symbols and priorities,
 garbage collection (could be emulated with help of smart pointers),
 use before define,
 formatted transput using complex formatting declarations,
 := – assignment operation symbol (to avoid confusion with equal sign),
 array (and slice operations on them, but in layered libraries),
 automatic UNIONs,
 CASE expressions,
 nonlocal GOTO
 intuitive declaration syntax due to its origin from C.

ALGOL 68 doesn't have:
 public/private struct member access protection,
 overloaded procedures (in contrast to operators),
 explicit memory deallocation, 
 forward declarations (use before definition is allowed)
 textual preprocessing (e.g. macros), 
 distinct reference and pointer types,
 comment lines (only bracketed comments),
 struct inheritance, struct member functions, virtual functions.
 destructors, exceptions, templates, namespaces, structured loop exits

Comparison of the assignment and equality operators

Code Examples

Union declaration and use
Assigning values into an A68 union variable is automatic, 
the type is "tagged" to the variable, but pulling the value back out is 
syntactically awkward as a conformity-clause is required.

ALGOL 68 example:
  union(int, char) x:=666;
  printf(($3d l$, (x|(int i):i) ))
C/C++ example:
  union { int i; char c; } x = { 666 };
  std::cout << x.i << std::endl; 
The net effect of "type-tagging" is that Algol68's strong typing
"half" encroaches into the union.

Mode declaration
A new mode (type) may be declared using a mode declaration:

 int max=99;
 mode newtype = [0:9][0:max]struct (
    long real a, b, c, short int i, j, k, ref real r
 );

This has the similar effect as the following C++ code:
const int max=99;
typedef struct { 
    double a, b, c; short i, j, k; float& r;
} newtype[9+1][max+1];
Note that for ALGOL 68 only the newtype name appears to the left of the equality, and most notably the construction is made - and can be read - from left to right without regard to priorities.

External links 
 A comparison of PASCAL and ALGOL 68 - Andrew S. Tanenbaum - June 1977.
 Orthogonal language design - Apr 2004 - retrieved May 10, 2007
 How Solve the Dangling Else? - Apr 2004 - retrieved May 10, 2007
 A comparison of Pascal, C, C++ and Algol68: Types, cont Type system, Type checking, Type safety, Type conversion, Primitive types, Aggregate types: arrays - Apr 2004 - retrieved May 10, 2007
 Arrays in Algol68 - Apr 2004 - retrieved May 10, 2007
 A Comparison of Arrays in ALGOL 68 and BLISS - Michael Walker - February 21, 2000 - retrieved  December 21 2015

Comparison of individual programming languages
C comparison
C++
Articles with example ALGOL 68 code
Articles with example C++ code